is a professional Japanese baseball player. He plays catcher for the Hanshin Tigers.

External links

 NPB.com

1977 births
Living people
Baseball people from Hyōgo Prefecture
Japanese baseball players
Nippon Professional Baseball catchers
Yokohama BayStars players
Yomiuri Giants players
Yokohama DeNA BayStars players
Hanshin Tigers players
Asian Games medalists in baseball
Baseball players at the 2002 Asian Games
Japanese baseball coaches
Nippon Professional Baseball coaches
Asian Games bronze medalists for Japan
Medalists at the 2002 Asian Games